Lake Kathryn is a census-designated place (CDP) in Lake County, Florida, United States. The population was 920 at the 2010 census. The area is also known as Lake Kathryn Heights. It is part of the Orlando–Kissimmee Metropolitan Statistical Area.

Geography
Lake Kathryn is located in northern Lake County surrounding a small lake of the same name. It is bordered to the north by Ocala National Forest.

Demographics

As of the census of 2000, there were 845 people, 344 households, and 215 families residing in the CDP. The racial makeup of the CDP was 96.09% White, 0.71% African American, 0.24% Native American, 0.24% Asian, and 2.72% from two or more races. Hispanic or Latino of any race were 2.01% of the population.

There were 344 households, out of which 25.3% had children under the age of 18 living with them, 49.7% were married couples living together, 6.4% had a female householder with no husband present, and 37.5% were non-families. 26.7% of all households were made up of individuals, and 12.8% had someone living alone who was 65 years of age or older.  The average household size was 2.46 and the average family size was 3.00.

In the CDP, the population was spread out, with 25.1% under the age of 18, 5.6% from 18 to 24, 27.2% from 25 to 44, 24.0% from 45 to 64, and 18.1% who were 65 years of age or older.  The median age was 40 years. For every 100 females, there were 108.6 males.  For every 100 females age 18 and over, there were 104.2 males.

The median income for a household in the CDP was $15,733, and the median income for a family was $17,143. Males had a median income of $25,000 versus $13,750 for females. The per capita income for the CDP was $8,816.  About 34.8% of families and 36.9% of the population were below the poverty line, including 36.5% of those under age 18 and 40.9% of those age 65 or over.

References

Census-designated places in Lake County, Florida
Greater Orlando
Census-designated places in Florida